Michael Clifton Pintard (born 3 July 1964) is a Bahamian politician serving as Leader of the Free National Movement and Leader of the Opposition since 27 November 2021. He has been the Member of Parliament (MP) for Marco City since 2017. First appointed in 2010, he served two terms in the Senate. He was the Minister of Agriculture and Marine Resources from 2018 to 2021.

Early life
Pintard was born in Nassau to Sister Laura Benson (née Hepburn) and John S. Pintard. He attended AF Adderley Senior High School and pursued an Associate degree in Agriculture at the College of the Bahamas. He went on to graduate with a Bachelor of Science in Agronomy from Tuskegee University in 1988 and later complete post-graduate courses in Agricultural Economics at McGill University in 2002. He also took a summer programme in Writing with the University of Miami and holds a certificate in compliance and anti-money laundering.

Career
Before going into politics, Pintard worked in consultancy with Scribes Ltd., radio broadcasting and art and theatre management, and urban planning. He helped to found Congo Town Development Ltd.

Pintard was sworn in as a Senator by then Prime Minister Hubert Ingraham on 7 April 2010. He was appointed again for a second term in 2014, when the FNM was in opposition. He ran for the Cat Island, Rum Cay & San Salvador parliamentary constituency in the 2012 Bahamian general election. He tried again in 2017, this time for Marco City and won. He was appointed Minister of Agriculture and Marine Resources by Hubert Minnis in July 2018. He was in office to oversee and report to the news about Hurricane Dorian in 2019.

Bibliography

References

Living people
1964 births
Free National Movement politicians
Government ministers of the Bahamas
Members of the House of Assembly of the Bahamas
Members of the Senate of the Bahamas
People from Nassau, Bahamas
McGill University alumni
Tuskegee University alumni
University of the Bahamas alumni